Orle is a village and a municipality ("općina") in Croatia in Zagreb County. According to the 2011 census, there are 1,975 inhabitants in the municipality, an absolute majority of which are Croats.

Settlements are:
 Bukevje
 Čret Posavski
 Drnek
 Obed
 Orle
 Ruča
 Stružec Posavski
 Suša
 Veleševec
 Vrbovo Posavsko

References

Populated places in Zagreb County
Municipalities of Croatia